Saltville is a town in Smyth and Washington counties in the U.S. state of Virginia. The population was 2,077 at the 2010 census. It is part of the Kingsport–Bristol (TN)–Bristol (VA) Metropolitan Statistical Area, which is a component of the Johnson City–Kingsport–Bristol, TN-VA Combined Statistical Area – commonly known as the "Tri-Cities" region.

History
Saltville was named for the salt marshes in the area.  Prior to European settlement, these marshes attracted local wildlife.  Excavations at the SV-2 archaeological site in the area have recovered several well preserved skeletons of now extinct species dating back to the last ice age. Indigenous peoples of varying cultures hunted at the marshes.  The historic Native American people in the area were the Chisca.

Archaeologists in 1992 proposed the existence of a prehistoric "Saltville Complex Petty Chiefdom", with a paramount village located at the Northwood High School site, 44SM8.  They reported "Saltville style gorgets" as well as iron and copper materials, scattered across the region.

During the spring of 1567, Spanish conquistador Hernando Moyano de Morales led a force of 15-20 soldiers northward from Fort San Juan in Joara, a city in what is now western North Carolina. The force attacked and burned the Chisca village of Maniatique, which may have been located at or near the site of Saltville.

During the American Civil War, Saltville was one of the Confederacy's main saltworks. The saltworks were considered vital to the Confederate war effort because the salt was used in preserving meat for Confederate soldiers and civilians. Because of its importance, the town was attacked by Northern forces intent on destroying the saltworks. On October 2, 1864, the First Battle of Saltville was fought there. In the battle Union forces attacked Saltville but were defeated by Confederate troops.  Following the battle a number of wounded black troops were murdered in what was dubbed the "Saltville Massacre."  (Shortly after the war Champ Ferguson was tried, convicted, and executed for war crimes for this and other killings.)

Two months later General George Stoneman, a Union cavalry commander, led a second attack on the saltworks (known as the Second Battle of Saltville).  This time the Confederates were defeated and the saltworks were destroyed by Union troops. The loss of the Saltville works was considered a major blow to the Confederacy's dwindling resources.

Preston House, Saltville Battlefields Historic District, Saltville Historic District, and the Scott-Walker House are listed on the National Register of Historic Places.

Hydrazine rocket fuel made by Olin Mathieson Chemical Corporation's plant in Saltville was used to power the rocket that took the first humans to the moon in the Apollo 11 mission.

Muck Dam collapse
Saltville was the location of the infamous "Muck Dam" break on December 24, 1924, which allowed the release of a huge volume of liquid chemical waste (stored there by the Mathieson Alkali Company) into the north fork of the Holston River taking the lives of nineteen people who lived along the river. The river remained polluted and virtually dead for several decades afterward.

Geography
According to the United States Census Bureau, the town has a total area of 8.1 square miles (21.0 km2), of which, 8.1 square miles (20.8 km2) of it is land and 0.04 square miles (0.1 km2) of it (0.49%) is water.

The salt caverns in Saltville, Virginia are used for natural gas storage, the only one to serve the Mid-Atlantic states. The cavern type in Saltville is considered the best for this purpose because the gas can be injected and removed quickly to meet immediate demand.

Climate
Climate in this area has mild differences between highs and lows, and there is adequate rainfall year-round.  The Köppen Climate Classification subtype for this climate is "Cfb". (Marine West Coast Climate/Oceanic climate).

Demographics

As of the census of 2010, there were 2,077 people, 879 households, and 593 families residing in the town. The population density (in 2000) was 273.7 people per square mile (105.7/km2). There were 967 housing units. The racial makeup of the town was 98.5% White, 0.4% African American, 0.1% Native American, 0.05% from other races, and 0.7% from two or more races. Hispanic or Latino of any race were 0.5% of the population.

There were 879 households, out of which 24% had children under the age of 18 living with them, 45.4% were married couples living together, 14.6% had a female householder with no husband present, and 32.5% were non-families. The average household size was 2.36 and the average family size was 2.91.

In the town, the population was spread out, with 24.5% under the age of 19, 6.5% from 20 to 24, 21.2% from 25 to 44, 30.5% from 45 to 64, and 17.5% who were 65 years of age or older. The median age was 43.4 years. For every 100 females, there were 89.3 males. For every 100 females age 18 and over, there were 85.1 males.

The median income for a household in the town was $24,375, and the median income for a family was $42,639. Males had a median income of $36,071 versus $30,063 for females. The per capita income for the town was $19,595. About 18.1% of families and 20.6% of the population were below the poverty line, including 41.4% of those under age 18 and 15.9% of those age 65 or over.

Arts and culture
The Museum of the Middle Appalachians is located in downtown Saltville. The museum displays exhibits on topics including the geological history of the region, the American Civil War, the company town era of Saltville's history, and the Woodland Indians.

Government
Saltville's current mayor is C. Todd Young, who took office in 2014 when he polled nearly 64 percent of all ballots cast.  The town is regulated by a town council consisting of six members, currently: Monica Johnson, Bryan Morris, Eugene Call, Gary Call, Steve Surber, and Jeff Comer.

Notable people
 Georgia Blizzard - Ceramics artist whose works are in the permanent collections of the Smithsonian American Art Museum and other museums.
 Clay Davidson - Country musician
 Texas Gladden- Sister of Smith, also a successful musician
 Robert Porterfield - founder of the Barter Theater
 Elizabeth Henry Campbell Russell - Sister of Patrick Henry, introduced Methodism to Southwest Virginia.  The Madam Russell Memorial United Methodist Church and the Elizabeth Cemetery in Saltville are named for her.
 Hobart Smith - Old time music legend

References

Further reading 
 Allison, Roger A. A Brief history of Saltville (Saltville, VA: Saltville Centennial Committee, 1996).
 Kent, William B. A History of Saltville, Virginia (Radford, VA: Commonwealth Pr., 1955).
 Mays, Thomas. The Saltville Massacre
 Sarvis, Will. The Salt Trade of Nineteenth Century Saltville, Virginia

External links
 Town's official website
 Saltville During the Civil War in Encyclopedia Virginia

 

Towns in Smyth County, Virginia
Towns in Washington County, Virginia
Towns in Virginia
Kingsport–Bristol metropolitan area
Company towns in the United States